Gangavalli block is a revenue block in the Salem district of Tamil Nadu, India. It has a total of 14 panchayat villages.  They are:

 Anaiyampatti
 Belur
 Goodamalai
 Jangamasamudram
 Kadambur
 Kondayampalli
 Krishnapuram
 Manmalai
 Naduvalur
 Nagiyampatti
 Odhiyathur
 Pachamalai
 Thagarapudur
 Ulipuram

References 

Revenue blocks of Salem district